Kommando 1944 is a short film depicting the internment of Japanese Americans during World War II. It was directed and written by Derek Quick. The film has won over 100 awards within its first month on the festival circuit around the world (September 2018) and is currently competing to break the Guinness World Records for short film wins.

Premise
The film was Inspired by Quick's Ottawa Tribe of Oklahoma Native American heritage as the grandchild of Charles, [Red Cedar] A. Todd, a US Army Korean War decorated combat veteran and a former Chief of the Ottawa Tribe who faced similar reservation segregation.

Awards and nominations

Kommando 1944 has screened at  Cannes Film Festival with the American Pavilion, Short Shorts and Asia in Japan, an Academy Awards Qualifier. Kommando 1944 was awarded  Grand Jury Prize, Outstanding Best Short Film from the cast of Steven Spielberg's Band Of Brothers and screened on D-Day in Normandy France on the 75th Anniversary.

References

External links
 Kommando 1944 website
  
 Kommando 1944 review in Festigious International Film Festival
 Kommando 1944 Instagram Official Page
 Kommando 1944 Kommando 1944 to screen in Cannes 2019 with the American Pavilion
 Kommando 1944 scores a 4.5 out of 5 from critics

2018 films
2018 short films
American short films
World War II films based on actual events
Films about the internment of Japanese Americans
Films set in 1944
Films set in Germany
Films set in California
Films shot in California
2010s English-language films